Kraig Nienhuis (born May 9, 1961) is a Canadian-Austrian former professional ice hockey player who played 87 games in the National Hockey League (NHL). After 3 years at RPI, he was signed as a free agent by the Boston Bruins in 1985. He played in 13 leagues over the course of his career and enjoyed most of his success in Europe. After becoming an Austrian citizen, he played for the Austria national ice hockey team at the 1996 IIHF ice hockey world championships.

Career statistics

Regular season and playoffs

References 

1961 births
Adler Mannheim players
Albany Choppers players
Boston Bruins players
Canadian ice hockey left wingers
Eisbären Berlin players
ECH Chur players
ESV Kaufbeuren players
HDD Olimpija Ljubljana players
EC KAC players
Living people
Maine Mariners players
Moncton Golden Flames players
Nottingham Panthers players
Port Huron Border Cats players
Rensselaer Polytechnic Institute alumni
RPI Engineers men's ice hockey players
Sportspeople from Sarnia
Undrafted National Hockey League players
Los Angeles Blades players
St. Louis Vipers players
Canadian expatriate ice hockey players in Slovenia
NCAA men's ice hockey national champions